The Ambassador from Israel to Nicaragua is Israel's foremost diplomatic representative in Nicaragua.

List of Ambassadors

Amir Ofek (Non-Resident, San José) 2019 - 
Chanan Olami (Non-Resident, San Jose) 1976 - 1979
Jeonathan Prato (Non-Resident, San Jose) 1969 - 1972
Walter Abeles (Non-Resident, San Jose) 1966 - 1969
Joshua Nissim Shai (Non-Resident, Guatemala City) 1959 - 1964
Minister David Shaltiel (Non-Resident, Mexico City) 1956 - 1959
Minister Yossef Keisari (Non-Resident, Mexico City) 1954 - 1956

References

Nicaraqua

Israel